Helios is the personification of the sun in Greek mythology.

Helios or Helio may also refer to:

People
 Helius (freedman) (died 69), freedman of the emperor Claudius
 Helio Alves (born 1966), Brazalian jazz pianist and son of pianists
 Hélio Castroneves (born 1975), Brazilian race-car driver
 Hélio Gracie (1913–2009), co-founder of Brazilian jiu-jitsu
 Eadweard Muybridge, an English-American photographer
 Keith Kenniff, an American ambient musician
 Helios, professional wrestler also known as Ricochet

Arts, entertainment and media

Art
 Helios (statue) Statue in White City, London

Books
 Helios (encyclopedia), a Greek general-knowledge reference work
 Victor "Helios" Frankenstein, a character from the Dean Koontz's Frankenstein series of novels

Film and television
 Helios (film)
 Helios, a character in the anime Sailor Moon

Music
 Helios (album), a 2014 album by The Fray
 Helios, a 1991 album by Phillip Boa
 Helios Overture, a 1903 composition by Danish composer Carl Nielsen

Video games
 Helios, an artificial intelligence in Deus Ex
 Helios, a character in God of War III based on the mythological character.
 Helios, the Japanese name for "Aeolus", a character in Mega Man ZX Advent
 Helios, a space station in the Borderlands series

Business and industry
 Helios (cinemas), a multiplex cinema operator in Poland
 Helios (lens brand), a defunct brand of camera lens manufactured in the U.S.S.R.
 Helios (mixing console), a British brand from 1969 to 1979
 Helios AG, a former German electrical engineering company; based in Cologne
 Helios Investment Partners, a London-based investment firm
 Helios, a German motorcycle; see History of BMW motorcycles

Aviation
 Helios Airways, a former low-cost airline operating scheduled and charter flights between Cyprus and many European destinations
 Helios Prototype, a NASA developed solar and fuel-cell-system-powered unmanned aerial vehicle
 High Energy Laser and Integrated Optical-dazzler and Surveillance, or HELIOS for short, is a laser-weapon system developed by the US military

Science

Computing
 HeliOS, a Unix-like computer operating system
 Helios, the project name for the Eclipse software version 3.6 release
 Helios, a supercomputer in Rokkasho, Aomori for simulating plasma physics
 Helios Voting, an electronic voting system

Space
 Helios (propulsion system), nuclear pulse propulsion system for spacecraft invented by Freeman Dyson, a precursor to his Project Orion
 Helios (spacecraft), defunct satellite
 Helios probes, deep space probes launched in the mid-1970s by the Federal Republic of Germany and NASA
 895 Helio, a minor planet orbiting the Sun
 Hélios 1B and Helios 2A, French military satellites

Other uses in science
 Helical orbit spectrometer, a nuclear spectrometer at the Argonne National Laboratory
 Zinc finger protein Helios, encoded by the IKZF2 gene

Sports teams
 FC Helios Kharkiv, a Ukrainian association-football team
 KK Helios Domžale, a Slovenian basketball team 
 SpVgg Helios München, a German association-football team from Munich
 Võru FC Helios, an Estonian association-football team

Other uses
 Helios (building), an apartment building in Seattle, Washington, United States
 , a U.S. Navy World War II repair ship
 , a French fishing vessel in service during the 1950s

See also